Colonel Alexander Abercromby,  (4 March 1784 – 27 August 1853) was a senior British Army officer during the Napoleonic Wars.  He also served for a short time as a Member of Parliament for Clackmannanshire.

Biography
Alexander Abercromby was the youngest son of Sir Ralph Abercromby, a British lieutenant-general noted for his services during the Napoleonic Wars and Mary Abercromby, 1st Baroness Abercromby. Born on 4 March 1784, Abercromby entered the army at an early age, and served as a volunteer with the 92nd Regiment in the expedition to the Helder in 1799. He soon obtained a commission, and saw service with his regiment in Egypt. He was appointed aide-de-camp to his father's old lieutenant and friend, Sir John Moore, during his command in Sicily in 1806, but was not with him in Spain.

Like his brother, Sir John, he was rapidly promoted, and in 1808, when only twenty-four, became lieutenant-colonel of the 28th Regiment. He accompanied his regiment when it was sent to Portugal to reinforce Lord Wellesley after the battle of Talavera. He commanded it at the battle of Busaco, and in the lines of Torres Vedras, and as senior colonel had the good fortune to command his brigade at the battle of Albuera. His services there were very conspicuous, and his brigade has been immortalised by Napier. He was soon superseded, but commanded his regiment at the surprise of Arroyo de Molinos and the storming of the forts at Almaraz.

In 1812 he was removed to the staff of the army, and was present as assistant-quartermaster-general at the battles of Vittoria, the Pyrenees, and Orthes. He served in the same capacity in 1815, and was present at  Quatre-Bras, Waterloo, and the storming of Péronne.

For his active services he was promoted to a colonelcy in the 2nd or Coldstream Guards, and made a companion of the Bath, a knight of the order of Maria Theresa of Austria, of the Tower and Sword of Portugal, and of St. George of Russia. He was returned to parliament in the Whig interest in 1817 for the county of Clackmannan in place of his brother Sir John, but retired next year. He was in command of the 2nd Guards, but retired on half-pay when there seemed to be no chance of another war, and died at his country seat in Scotland on 27 August 1853. He had no small share of the military ability of his family, and was an admirable regimental and staff officer; but the long peace which followed the battle of Waterloo gave him no opportunity to show whether he had his father's ability to command an army.

Honours
Companion of the Order of the Bath (1815)
Knight of the Order of the Tower and Sword
Knight of the Military Order of Maria Theresa
Fourth Class, Order of St. George

Notes

References

Attribution

External links 
 

1784 births
1853 deaths
Members of the Parliament of the United Kingdom for Scottish constituencies
British Army personnel of the Napoleonic Wars
British Army personnel of the French Revolutionary Wars
Gordon Highlanders officers
28th Regiment of Foot officers
Coldstream Guards officers
UK MPs 1812–1818
Whig (British political party) MPs for Scottish constituencies
Companions of the Order of the Bath
Knights Cross of the Military Order of Maria Theresa
Recipients of the Order of the Tower and Sword
Recipients of the Waterloo Medal
Alexander
Younger sons of barons